Bernard Verheecke (Bruges, 13 January 1957) is a former Belgian footballer who played as a forward.

Honours 

 Club Brugge

 Belgian First Division: 1977–78,1979–80
 Belgian Cup: 1978-79 (finalists)
 European Champion Clubs' Cup: 1977-78 (runners-up)
 Jules Pappaert Cup: 1978
 Bruges Matins: 1979

References 

1957 births
Living people
Footballers from Bruges
Belgian footballers
Association football forwards
Club Brugge KV players
Belgian Pro League players
Cercle Brugge K.S.V. players
R.W.D. Molenbeek players
K.A.A. Gent players
Servette FC players
Belgian expatriate footballers
Belgian expatriate sportspeople in Switzerland
Expatriate footballers in Switzerland